Thomas Hopkins (29 July 1903 – 23 January 1983) was a British gymnast. He competed in nine events at the 1924 Summer Olympics.

References

External links
 

1903 births
1983 deaths
British male artistic gymnasts
Olympic gymnasts of Great Britain
Gymnasts at the 1924 Summer Olympics
Place of birth missing
20th-century British people